John Hubert de la Poer Beresford, 8th Marquess of Waterford (14 July 1933 – 11 February 2015) was an Irish peer. He succeeded to the marquessate in 1934. He was educated at Eton, and later served as a lieutenant in the Royal Horse Guards' Supplementary Reserve.

Biography
A highly skilled horseman, Lord Waterford rode the first of his many point-to-point winners while still at Eton, and he went on to become the youngest-ever member of the Irish Turf Club. From 1960 to 1985, he was captain of the All-Ireland Polo Club and its highest handicap player. For 12 years (1960–72) he was a member, at both medium and high-goal levels, of the Duke of Edinburgh's Windsor Park team, which won the British open championship for the Cowdray Park Gold Cup twice, and on another occasion the high-goal Warwickshire Cup.

After retiring from the Army, Lord Waterford returned to Curraghmore and became director of a number of enterprises to provide local employment, among them the Munster Chipboard company, Waterford Properties (a hotel group) and, later, Kenmare Resources, an Irish oil and gas exploration company. He was a founder patron of the Waterford International Festival of Light Opera.

He died on 11 February 2015 at the age of 81 and was succeeded by his son, Henry Beresford (b. 1958).

Family
In 1957 he married Lady Caroline Olein Geraldine Wyndham-Quin, daughter of the 6th Earl of Dunraven and Mount-Earl.  The couple had three sons and a daughter:
Henry Nicholas de la Poer Beresford, 9th Marquess of Waterford (born 23 March 1958)
Lord Charles Richard de la Poer Beresford (born 18 January 1960)
Lord James Patrick de la Poer Beresford (born 10 December 1965)
Lady Alice Rose de la Poer Beresford (born 31 July 1970)

His family seats were Curraghmore, Portlaw, County Waterford, and Glenbridge Lodge, Valleymount, County Wicklow.

Ancestry

References

1933 births
2015 deaths
People educated at Eton College
People from County Waterford
People from County Wicklow
Royal Horse Guards officers
John
8
Waterford